Villarreal de la Canal is a locality located in the municipality of Canal de Berdún, in Huesca province, Aragon, Spain. As of 2020, it has a population of 46.

Geography 
Villarreal de la Canal is located 89km northwest of Huesca.

References

Populated places in the Province of Huesca